There are about 2,680 known moth species of Madagascar. The moths (mostly nocturnal) and butterflies (mostly diurnal) together make up the taxonomic order Lepidoptera.

This is a list of moth species which have been recorded in Madagascar. They are listed alphabetically by family.

Adelidae
Adela gymnota (Meyrick, 1912)
Adela janineae (Viette, 1954)
Adela tsaratanana (Viette, 1954)

Alucitidae
Alucita decaryella (Viette, 1956)
Alucita euscripta Minet, 1976

Arctiidae

Argyresthiidae

Autostichidae
Encrasima insularis (Butler, 1880)
Pachnistis nigropunctella Viette, 1955

Bombycidae
Ocinara malagasy Viette, 1965

Brachodidae
Nigilgia seyrigella Viette, 1955
Nigilgia toulgoetella Viette, 1955
Pseudocossus boisduvalii Viette, 1955
Pseudocossus uliginosus Kenrick, 1914

Callidulidae
Caloschemia pulchra (Butler, 1878)
Griveaudia charlesi Viette, 1968
Griveaudia nigropuncta Viette, 1958
Griveaudia vieui Viette, 1958
Pterothysanus pictus Butler, 1884

Carposinidae
Meridarchis unitacta Diakonoff, 1970

Choreutidae
Tebenna micalis (Mann, 1857)

Coleophoridae
Coleophora leucobela (Meyrick, 1934)

Copromorphidae
Rhynchoferella syncentra (Meyrick, 1916)

Cosmopterigidae

Cossidae

Crambidae

Depressariidae
Odites agathopella Viette, 1968
Odites anasticta Meyrick, 1930
Odites anisocarpa Meyrick, 1930
Odites atomosperma Meyrick, 1933
Odites cataxantha Meyrick, 1915
Odites consecrata Meyrick, 1917
Odites fotsyella Viette, 1973
Odites haplonoma Meyrick, 1915
Odites hemigymna Meyrick, 1930
Odites inversa Meyrick, 1914
Odites johanna Viette, 1987
Odites lioxesta Meyrick, 1933
Odites malagasiella Viette, 1968
Odites metaclista Meyrick, 1915
Odites minetella Viette, 1985
Odites ochrodryas Meyrick, 1933
Odites perfusella Viette, 1958
Odites thesmia Meyrick, 1917
Odites tinactella Viette, 1958
Odites tsaraella Viette, 1986
Odites typota Meyrick, 1915

Depressariinae
Agonopterix liesella Viette, 1987
Eutorna diluvialis Meyrick, 1913
Eutorna punctinigrella Viette, 1955
Orophia madagascariensis (Viette, 1951)
Orophia toulgoetianum (Viette, 1954)

Ethmiinae

Drepanidae

Dudgeoneidae
Dudgeonea locuples (Mabille, 1879)
Dudgeonea malagassa Viette, 1958

Elachistidae
Elachista crocogastra Meyrick, 1908

Epipyropidae
Epipyrops grandidieri Viette, 1961
Epipyrops malagassica Jordan, 1928
Epipyrops radama Viette, 1961

Eupterotidae
Jana palliatella Viette, 1955

Gelechiidae

Geometridae

Glyphipterigidae
Chrysocentris eupepla Meyrick, 1930
Glyphipterix madagascariensis Viette, 1951

Gracillariidae

Heliozelidae
Antispila merinaella (Viette, 1955)

Hyblaeidae
Hyblaea apricans (Boisduval, 1833)
Hyblaea madagascariensis Viette, 1961
Hyblaea paulianii Viette, 1961
Hyblaea puera (Cramer, 1777)

Immidae
Moca humbertella (Viette, 1956)

Lacturidae
Gymnogramma candidella (Viette, 1963)
Gymnogramma griveaudi (Gibeaux, 1982)
Gymnogramma iambiodella (Viette, 1958)
Gymnogramma luctuosa (Gibeaux, 1982)
Gymnogramma ratovosoni (Gibeaux, 1982)
Gymnogramma tabulatrix Meyrick, 1930
Gymnogramma toulgoeti (Gibeaux, 1982)
Gymnogramma viettei (Gibeaux, 1982)

Lasiocampidae

Lecithoceridae

Limacodidae

Lymantriidae
{{columns-list|colwidth=20em|
Abakabaka fuliginosa (Saalmüller, 1884)
Abakabaka phasiana (Butler, 1882)
Alina ochroderoea (Mabille, 1897)
Ankova belessichares (Collenette, 1936)
Ankova lignea (Butler, 1879)
Cadorela translucida Griveaud, 1973
Collenettema chionoptera (Collenette, 1936)
Collenettema crocipes (Boisduval, 1833)
Crorema viettei Collenette, 1960
Croremopsis argenna (Mabille, 1900)
Dasychira bata Collenette, 1939
Dasychira butleri (Swinhoe, 1923)
Dasychira chloebapha Collenette, 1930
Dasychira colini (Mabille, 1893)
Dasychira maculata Griveaud, 1974
Dasychira nolana (Mabille, 1882)
Dasychira problematica Hering, 1926
Dasychira viettei Collenette, 1954
Eopirga candida Hering, 1926
Eopirga heptasticta (Mabille, 1878)
Erika analalava Griveaud, 1976
Eudasychira ampliata (Butler, 1878)
Eudasychira audeoudi (Collenette, 1939)
Eudasychira aurantiaca (Kenrick, 1914)
Eudasychira aureotincta (Kenrick, 1914)
Eudasychira diaereta (Collenette, 1959)
Eudasychira galactina (Mabille, 1880)
Eudasychira leucopsaroma (Collenette, 1959)
Euproctis apoblepta Collenette, 1953
Euproctis emilei Griveaud, 1973
Euproctis eurybia Collenette, 1959
Euproctis fervida (Walker, 1863)
Euproctis fleuriotii (Guérin-Méneville, 1862)
Euproctis incommoda (Butler, 1882)
Euproctis juliettae Griveaud, 1973
Euproctis lemuria (Hering, 1926)
Euproctis limonea (Butler, 1882)
Euproctis mahafalensis Griveaud, 1973
Euproctis marojejya Griveaud, 1973
Euproctis ochrea (Butler, 1878)
Euproctis oxyptera Collenette, 1936
Euproctis producta (Walker, 1863)
Euproctis putilla Saalmüller, 1884
Euproctis sanguigutta Hampson, 1905
Euproctis stenobia Collenette, 1959
Euproctis straminicolor Janse, 1915
Euproctis titania Butler, 1879
Fanala abbreviata (Kenrick, 1914)
Gallienica ambahona (Collenette, 1954)
Gallienica andringitra Griveaud, 1977
Gallienica antongila Griveaud, 1977
Gallienica brunea Griveaud, 1977
Gallienica candida Griveaud, 1977
Gallienica didya Griveaud, 1977
Gallienica griveaudi (Collenette, 1959)
Gallienica lakato Griveaud, 1977
Gallienica lineata Griveaud, 1977
Gallienica maligna (Butler, 1882)
Gallienica mandraka Griveaud, 1977
Gallienica nosivola (Collenette, 1959)
Gallienica sanguinea (Hering, 1926)
Gallienica sphenosema (Collenette, 1959)
Gallienica viettei Griveaud, 1977
Gallienica violacea Griveaud, 1977
Griveaudyria mascarena (Butler, 1878)
Homoeomeria cretosa (Saalmüller, 1884)
Homoeomeria iroceraea (Collenette, 1959)
Jabaina ania (Hering, 1926)
Jabaina ithystropha (Collenette, 1939)
Jabaina uteles (Collenette, 1936)
Kintana ocellatula (Hering, 1926)
 Labordea chalcoptera(Collenette, 1936)
 Labordea hedilacea(Collenette, 1936)
 Labordea leucolineataGriveaud, 1977
 Labordea malgassica(Kenrick, 1914)
 Labordea marmor(Mabille, 1880)
 Labordea prasina(Butler, 1882)
 Labordea suareziGriveaud, 1977Laelia croperoides Hering, 1926Laeliolina paetula Hering, 1926Lanitra hexamitobalia (Collenette, 1936)Leptepilepta diaphanella (Mabille, 1897)Leptepilepta umbrata (Griveaud, 1973)Leucoma lechrisemata Collenette, 1959Lymantica binotata (Mabille, 1880)Lymantica brunneata (Kenrick, 1914)Lymantica canariensis (Kenrick, 1914)Lymantica castanea (Kenrick, 1914)Lymantica castaneostriata (Kenrick, 1914)Lymantica dubia (Kenrick, 1914)Lymantica dulcinea (Butler, 1882)Lymantica hypobolimaea (Collenette, 1959)Lymantica joannisi (Le Cerf, 1921)Lymantica kenricki (Swinhoe, 1923)Lymantica lamda (Collenette, 1936)Lymantica leucophaes (Collenette, 1936)Lymantica malgassica (Kenrick, 1914)Lymantica phaeosericea (Mabille, 1884)Lymantica polycyma (Collenette, 1936)Lymantica polysticta (Collenette, 1929)Lymantica pruinosa (Butler, 1879)Lymantica rosea (Butler, 1879)Lymantica rufofusca Mabille, 1900Lymantica russula (Collenette, 1933)Lymantica rusticana (Hering, 1927)Lymantica suarezia (Mabille, 1897)Lymantica velutina (Mabille, 1879)Lymantria rebuti (Poujade, 1889)Lymantria rhodophora (Mabille, 1879)Marbla divisa (Walker, 1855)Marblepsis ochrobasis Collenette, 1938Masoandro peculiaris (Butler, 1879)Masoandro polia (Collenette, 1936)Mpanjaka albovirida (Griveaud, 1970)Mpanjaka betschi (Griveaud, 1974)Mpanjaka collenettei (Griveaud, 1974)Mpanjaka conioptera (Collenette, 1936)Mpanjaka cyrtozona (Collenette, 1936)Mpanjaka disjunctifascia (Collenette, 1936)Mpanjaka elegans (Butler, 1882)Mpanjaka euthyzona (Collenette, 1959)Mpanjaka gentilis (Butler, 1879)Mpanjaka grandidieri (Butler, 1882)Mpanjaka junctifascia (Collenette, 1936)Mpanjaka leucopicta (Collenette, 1936)Mpanjaka montana (Griveaud, 1974)Mpanjaka nigrosparsata (Kenrick, 1914)Mpanjaka olsoufieffae (Collenette, 1936)Mpanjaka pastor (Butler, 1882)Mpanjaka perinetensis (Collenette, 1936)Mpanjaka pyrsonota (Collenette, 1939)Mpanjaka renominata (Strand, 1915)Mpanjaka titan (Collenette, 1959)Mpanjaka vibicipennis (Butler, 1879)Mpanjaka viola (Butler, 1879)Naroma madecassa Griveaud, 1971Noliproctis milupa Nye, 1980Noliproctis sogai (Griveaud, 1974)Nolosia marmorata Hampson, 1900Numenoides grandis Butler, 1879Ogoa melanocera (Mabille, 1878)Ogoa oberthueri Rothschild, 1916Ogoa vitrina (Mabille, 1878)Orana grammodes (Hering, 1926)Orgyia malagassica Kenrick, 1913Peloroses praestans (Saalmüller, 1884)Pirgula delicata Griveaud, 1973Pirgula jordani (Hering, 1926)Pirgula melanoma Collenette, 1936Pirgula monopunctata Griveaud, 1973Pirgula polyopha Collenette, 1959Pirgula sexpunctata Griveaud, 1973Porthesaroa aureopsis Hering, 1926Porthesaroa brunea Griveaud, 1973Porthesaroa lithoides (Collenette, 1936)Porthesaroa parvula (Kenrick, 1914)Porthesaroa procincta Saalmüller, 1880Psalis punctuligera Mabille, 1880Pyramocera barica (Mabille, 1878)Radamaria miselioides (Kenrick, 1914)Radamaria zena (Hering, 1926)Rahona albilunula (Collenette, 1936)Rahona compseuta (Collenette, 1939)Rivotra viridipicta (Kenrick, 1914)Rivotra zonobathra (Collenette, 1936)Salvatgea bipuncta (Hering, 1926)Scaphocera marginepunctata (Saalmüller, 1878)Scaphocera turlini Griveaud, 1973Stenaroa crocea Griveaud, 1977Stenaroa flavescens Griveaud, 1977Stenaroa ignepicta Hampson, 1910Stenaroa miniata (Kenrick, 1914)Stenaroa rubriflava Griveaud, 1973Turlina punctata Griveaud, 1976Varatra acosmeta (Collenette, 1939)Viettema ratovosoni (Viette, 1967)Vohitra melissograpta (Collenette, 1936)Volana lichenodes (Collenette, 1936)Volana mniara (Collenette, 1936)Volana phloeodes (Collenette, 1936)Zavana acroleuca (Hering, 1926)Zavana iodnephes (Collenette, 1936)
}}

LyonetiidaeLeucoptera coffeella (Guérin-Méneville, 1842)

MetarbelidaeSaalmulleria dubiefi Viette, 1974Saalmulleria stumpffi (Saalmüller, 1884)

NepticulidaeEctoedemia scobleella Minet, 2004

Noctuidae

Nolidae

Notodontidae

Oecophoridae

PantheidaeAdaphaenura minuscula (Butler, 1882)Adaphaenura ratovosoni Viette, 1973Daphoenura fasciata Butler, 1878Epicausis smithii (Mabille, 1880)Epicausis vaovao Viette, 1973

PlutellidaeIridostoma catatella Viette, 1956Plutella xylostella (Linnaeus, 1758)Tetanostola hexagona Meyrick, 1931

Psychidae

Pterophoridae

Pyralidae

Saturniidae

Sesiidae

Sphingidae

StathmopodidaePhytophlops nigricella Viette, 1958Stathmopoda clarkei Viette, 1951Stathmopoda maisongrossiella Viette, 1954Stathmopoda vadoniella Viette, 1954

Thyrididae

Tineidae

TischeriidaeCoptotriche alavelona Lees & Stonis, 2007

Tortricidae

Uraniidae

Xyloryctidae

Yponomeutidae

ZygaenidaeAnkasocris striatus Viette, 1965Ischnusia culiculina (Mabille, 1878)Madaprocris minetorum Viette, 1978Sthenoprocris brondeli Viette, 1978Sthenoprocris malgassica'' Hampson, 1920

See also
List of butterflies of Madagascar

References 

 List
Madagascar
Moths
Madagascar